The following is a list of islands of Brunei. The islands are either located in rivers, South China Sea, Serasa Bay or Brunei Bay.

List of Islands

Brunei-Muara District

Mukim Kota Batu 

 Berambang Island – 
 Cermin Island – 
 Sibungor Island – 
 Baru-Baru Island – 
 Berbunut Island – 
 Keingaran Island – 
 Pepatan Island – 
 Lumut Lunting – 
 Silipan Island – 
 Silama Island –

Mukim Serasa 

 Muara Besar Island – 
 Pelumpong Spit – 
 Bedukang Island –

Mukim Kilanas 

 Ranggu Island – 
 Luba Island –

Mukim Mentiri 

 Si Mangga Besar Island – 
 Si Mangga Damit Island – 
 Salar Island – 
 Pasir Tengah Island –

Other islands 

 Pelong Rocks – 
 Punyit –

Temburong District

Mukim Labu 

 Selirong Island – 
 Siarau Island – 
 Kitang Island – 
 Selanjak Island – 
 Tarap Island – 
 Pituat Island –

Mukim Bangar 

 Kibi Island –

Mukim Amo 

 Batu Mas Island – 
 Langsat Island – 
 Amo Island

Tutong District

Mukim Pekan Tutong 

 Setawat Island – 
 Bakuku Island –

Mukim Tanjong Maya 

 Tanjong Maya Island –

See also 

 Geography of Brunei
 List of islands

References 

Brunei, List of islands of
Islands